Year 1045 (MXLV) was a common year starting on Tuesday (link will display the full calendar) of the Julian calendar.

Events 
 January 20 – Pope Sylvester III becomes the 146th pope, succeeding Benedict IX, who abdicated during the previous year.
 January 23 – Edward the Confessor, King of England, marries Edith of Wessex, and begins construction of Westminster Abbey in England.
 February – Pope Sylvester III is deposed (election deemed invalid); Pope Benedict IX is elected once more, becoming the 147th pope.
 February 5 – Emperor Go-Reizei ascends the throne of Japan.
 May 5 – Pope Gregory VI becomes the 148th pope, following the resignation of Pope Benedict IX in exchange for money. There are growing allegations that simony is taking place during Gregory VI's reign.
 Movable type printing is invented by Bi Sheng in China.
 The Qingli Reforms, put forth by the Chinese statesman Fan Zhongyan in 1043, are halted by their conservative ministerial peers, but will later influence reform efforts under Wang Anshi.
 The Bagratid Kingdom of Armenia is surrendered to the Eastern Roman Empire, ending the Kingdom.

Births 
 Robert of Arbrissel (approximately) (d. 1116), Bretonic preacher and founder of Fontevraud Abbey
 Stephen, Count of Blois (approximately) (d. 1102)
 Huang Tingjian, famous Chinese calligrapher, painter, and poet (d. 1105)
 Probable
 Margaret, queen of Scotland (d. 1093)

Deaths 
 February 7 – Emperor Go-Suzaku of Japan (b. 1009)
 May 27 – Bruno of Würzburg, imperial chancellor of Italy (b. c. 1005)
 Hemma of Gurk, Austrian religious founder and countess (b. 980)
 Maria Skleraina, Byzantine Imperial political adviser
 Radbot, Count of Habsburg (b. 985)

References